Speed shops are local brick and mortar businesses which typically purvey aftermarket automotive accessories intended to increase the performance of automobiles. They came into existence in the 1940s in North America as a result of the then rising popularity in hotrod culture. The term has recently broadened such that it encompasses motorcycle performance.

Examples 
 Austin Speed Shop, owned by Jesse James
 BRICK AND MORTAR BUSINESSES
 Rocco and Cheater's Speed Shop
 So-Cal Speed Shop

References

History of the automobile
American culture
Automotive industry in the United States